Eutoxeres is a genus of hummingbird in the family Trochilidae. 
The genus contains the following species:

 
Bird genera
 
Taxonomy articles created by Polbot
Taxa named by Ludwig Reichenbach